Victor S. Dominguez (May 3, 1935 – February 8, 2008) was a Filipino politician. He started his political career as a Vice-Governor of Mountain Province on April 7, 1967. He was elected to six terms as a member of Congress, representing the Lone District of Mountain Province.

References

People from Mountain Province
1935 births
2008 deaths
Members of the House of Representatives of the Philippines from Mountain Province
Members of the Batasang Pambansa